Vigo Rugby Club (known for sponsorship reasons as –Universidade Vigo) is a rugby union club based in Vigo, in the Spanish autonomous community of Galicia. The club competes in the top-flight División de Honor since 2011–12 season.

History
In 1987, a group of university students arrived in Vigo for their Christmas holiday. They played rugby on one of Vigo's beaches and decided to form a rugby club. The Vigo Rugby Club was founded in 1988 with Quique Paz as the first chairman of the board of directors. It began playing in the Segunda División Regional, and were promoted in their first season to the Primera División Regional.

In 1992, the club was absorbed by the University of Vigo, which took over operations. In 1999, the club regained control of operations, but continued the partnership with the university. They play their home games at Campus As Lagoas-Marcosende on the campus of the University of Vigo.

In 2011, Vigo RC was promoted to the top-flight División de Honor.

Honours
Copa Xunta: 14
Champions: 1992–93, 1993–94, 1997–98, 1998–99, 2001–02, 2002–03, 2003–04, 2005–06, 2006–07, 2007–08, 2008–09, 2009–10, 2010–11, 2011–12

Season by season

4 seasons in División de Honor

Squad 2013–14

Internationally Capped players
  Campbell Johnstone
  Norm Maxwell
 Marcos Mella
 David Monreal
  Óscar Ferreras
  Carlos Blanco
  Alejandro  Blanco
  Lionel Pardo
  Francisco Usero
  Vasilis Katsakos
  Nikolas Mavreas
  Cameron Wyper
  Gaston Ibarburu

References

External links
Official site 

Spanish rugby union teams
Sports teams in Galicia (Spain)
Sport in Vigo
University of Vigo
Rugby clubs established in 1988